The "Final Four" (also called European Champion Cup) is a post-season baseball tournament sanctioned and created by the Confederation of European Baseball (CEB). The tournament features the four best teams in the two European Cups. The champion later represents Europe in the Asia Series.

The most recent edition of the tournament was held in Nettuno, Italy on August 29–30, 2012.

Results

Medal table

See also
European Baseball Championship
Baseball awards#Europe

References

  
International baseball competitions in Europe
Recurring sporting events established in 2008
2008 establishments in Europe